The IFMAR World Championship for 1:8th IC Off-Road Cars (officially "IFMAR 1:8 IC Off-Road World Championship", nicknamed Nitro Buggy Worlds), is a world championship radio controlled car race hosted by the International Federation of Model Auto Racing (IFMAR). It takes place biennially on even years since 1986.

The event is open exclusively to 1:8 scale off-road buggies running on nitromethanol mix fuel; these are 4WD cars characterized by its large wheels designed for off-road driving and enclosed single-seater bodyshell with large rear spoiler with two cutouts; at the rear to enable a cylinder head to protrude out at the back and the other, at the front to enable quick refueling.

Venues

Winners

Statistics

Most Wins

Drivers

Car manufacturers

Engines

Transmitters

By Member Blocs (Drivers)

Win(s) by Nations (Drivers)

Most represented in final
Note: Entries expanded to accommodate 12 drivers (from 10 in previous years) as of 2008, those with more than 50% represented are listed.
Italics represents in which a driver of the country who didn't win, italics on nationalities indicate host nation.

Nations (drivers)

Car manufacturers

Notes

References 

 
Recurring sporting events established in 1986
Biennial sporting events
1986 establishments in France